The heart of the Brazilian emperor Dom Pedro I has been preserved since his death in 1834. The container is kept in an urn, locked under lock and key. The heart is considered a relic by the Portuguese government.

Dom Pedro I's body is buried in São Paulo, in the crypt of the Monument to Independence. By decision of the monarch himself, as one of his last requests in life, the heart was separated and kept in Portugal. Dom Pedro I asked that the heart be preserved in Porto because of the relevance of the city in the dispute for the Portuguese throne between Dom Pedro I (known as Dom Pedro IV in Portugal) and his brother Dom Miguel.

After the emperor's death from tuberculosis in September 1834, a series of royal and ecclesiastical agreements were made so that, in February 1835, the heart was finally sent to Porto, kept in a gilded silver vase, wrapped in a black velvet-lined case, inside the Church of Our Lady of Lapa.

The conditions of the heart are the subject of research in the field of forensic anthropology.

History

Background

On September 23, 1834, on the eve of his death, Dom Pedro I wrote a letter addressed to the Brazilian public, in which he declares his wish regarding the fate of his remains after death:

Brazilians! I leave my heart to the heroic City of Porto, theater of my true glory, and the rest of my mortal spoils to the City of Lisbon, place of my birth; but you possess the most precious relic, the living emanation of my being, my son! My only son!

Dom Pedro was not the first monarch to determine, while he was still alive, that his heart should be separated from his body and preserved or buried. Even during the Middle Ages, monarchs such as Robert I of Scotland, Richard I of England, and Henry I of England had their hearts buried in different locations than the rest of their bodies.

The death of Dom Pedro and the arrival in the city of Porto

After Dom Pedro died of tuberculosis, his daughter, Maria II of Portugal, decided to fulfill her father's wish. As narrated by Amélie of Leuchtenberg, Dom Pedro's widow, in a letter to her daughter Januária of Bragança, an autopsy of the body was performed, revealing a swollen and heavy right lung and an enlarged-looking heart.

However, the late emperor had not made it clear in which part of the city of Porto his heart should be kept, and soon a dispute ensued. However, the  had favored the chapel of São Vicente in the Sé of Porto.

Finally, the decision was made in February 1836 that the relic of the heart would finally be kept at Lapa. On February 4, the heart set sail across the Tagus River toward the city of Porto aboard the warship Jorge IV, commanded by Colonel  and a guard of honor composed of 70 soldiers.

Arriving in  after a 3-day trip, the delegation was received with an official ceremony, where the urn containing the heart was handed over to the Chamber of Porto, along with its key.

The original urn was composed of an outer part made of mahogany and an inner part made of silver. Later, the heart was placed inside a hermetically sealed glass vase, which is contained inside the silver urn.

Bicentennial of Brazilian Independence

In the context of the bicentennial celebrations of the Independence of Brazil, Dom Pedro I's heart was transported to Brazil and exhibited in Brasilia.

The coming of the body to Brazil was idealized by Nise Yamaguchi in the first half of 2022, in dialogue with President Jair Bolsonaro, and the descendants of Dom Pedro, Federal Deputy Luiz Philippe de Orléans e Bragança and Bertrand of Orléans-Braganza. The deputy, great-great-great-grandson of Dom Pedro I, is said to have traveled to Porto, where he made contact with those responsible for the Lapa Church and with members of the City Council. The  and the Brazilian consulate got involved in the negotiation, proposing that the heart be temporarily loaned for the bicentennial festivities.

Both the City Council and the Third Order of Lapa showed no opposition to the proposal, provided that the safety of the heart was ensured. The President of the Portuguese Republic, Marcelo Rebelo de Sousa, had been consulted, and suggested that the loan of the relic be in fact carried out. The study concluded that there would be no risk to the relic, provided it was transported in a pressurized chamber on the plane.

Thus, in a session on July 18, the Porto City Council unanimously approved the proposal for the loan of the heart. The approved proposal considers that all costs related to transport will be the responsibility of the Brazilian government, and establishes the legal basis for the effective transfer of the relic.

Finally, an official session was held with President Jair Bolsonaro on the ramp of the Planalto Palace.

The solemnity and the exposition of Dom Pedro I's heart were criticized, especially for the cost of the transfer and the morbidity of the tributes. It was also criticized the fact that, with the coming of the organ to Brazil, Dom Pedro I's last request was not respected, since he had asked for the heart to remain in Portugal.

Notes

References

Pedro I of Brazil
Body parts of individual people
2022 in Brazil